José Francisco Rábago Castillo (born 8 March 1940) is a Mexican politician from the Institutional Revolutionary Party. From 2009 to 2012 he served as Deputy of the LXI Legislature of the Mexican Congress representing Tamaulipas.

References

1940 births
Living people
People from Tampico, Tamaulipas
Institutional Revolutionary Party politicians
21st-century Mexican politicians
Deputies of the LXI Legislature of Mexico
Members of the Chamber of Deputies (Mexico) for Tamaulipas